Thakandhoo (Dhivehi: ތަކަންދޫ) is one of the inhabited islands of  Haa Alif Atoll administrative division and is geographically part of Thiladhummathi Atoll in the north of the Maldives. It is an island-level administrative constituency governed by the Thakandhoo Island Council.

History
The tomb of Ali Thakurufaanu, who was killed in 1572 during a battle against the invading Portuguese, is located on this island. He was the first person to be killed in the 8-year war against the Portuguese led by Muhammad Thakurufaanu Al-Azam of Utheemu. The Malabars decapitated the body and took the head to Male' to ceremonially present to the regent Andiri Andirin. Maldivians later stole the head from the garrison and buried it in the island of Funadhoo. The body was later buried in Thakandhoo.

Geography

Demography

References

External links
Isles: Thakandhoo

Islands of the Maldives